This is a list of every song ever released by American rock band Weezer. It gives information about songwriter(s), original release, and year of release. It contains all the songs of the previously released albums, singles and EPs, and all B-sides.

Songs

Notes

References

Weezer